St. James Chapel, now All Souls Episcopal Church, is a historic chapel on the east side of Main Street (Suffolk CR 68), 250 feet north of Stony Brook Lane in Stony Brook, New York. The church was built in 1889 and is a gable-roofed frame building clad in wood shingles. It features an open, octagonal bell tower, cross gables, and an arcaded porch. It was designed by architect Stanford White.

It was added to the National Register of Historic Places in 2000.

References

Properties of religious function on the National Register of Historic Places in New York (state)
Queen Anne architecture in New York (state)
Churches completed in 1889
19th-century churches in the United States
Churches in Suffolk County, New York
National Register of Historic Places in Suffolk County, New York